Sosa or Soso (Village ID 49105) is one of the 14 villages in the Chaudans Valley of the sub-district Dharchula, district Pithoragarh in the Kumaoni region of Uttarakhand. According to the 2011 census it has a population of 309 living in 77 households. Its main agriculture product is paddy growing.

The residents are from the Rung community and are mainly Hyanki, Garkhal,Kunwar and Budathoki. The language spoken is Bangbani, which falls under the RungLo regional dialect of the Rung people.

The village is predominantly occupied by Hyanki clan and are of the highest strata. It is believed that they are the descendants of Lalmani (Lata) Paliwal who migrated from Chittaurgarh sometime in mid 1700 AD. The available manuscripts tell that his only son Hriday (Hridwa) Pailwal along with his two wives was the actual founder of Hyanki clan in this region. There are many stories around the actual reason for their migration from Chittaurgarh, but none has been established as yet.

References

Villages in Pithoragarh district